The 2020 European U23 Judo Championships were an edition of the European U23 Judo Championships, organised by the European Judo Union. It was held in Poreč, Croatia from 9–10 November 2020.

Medal overview
Source:

Men

Women

Medal table

References

External links
 Results
 

European U23 Judo Championships
 U23
Judo
European U23
International sports competitions hosted by Croatia